Protein SGT1 is a protein that in humans is encoded by the ECD gene.

References

Further reading